Deuk Deuk Tong (啄啄糖) or commonly referred to as Ding Ding Tong (叮叮糖) is a type of traditional candy in Hong Kong. It is a hard maltose candy with sesame and ginger flavours. The sweet is made by first melting maltose, then adding to it various ingredients and continuously stirring the mixture. Before the mixture solidifies, it is put on a metal stick and pulled into a line shape, then coiled into the shape of a plate.

In Cantonese, deuk means chiselling, breaking things into pieces. When street hawkers sold the candy, it was necessary for them to break apart its original shape with a pair of flat chisels, namely "deuk".  The act of chiselling makes noise and attracts children to buy. Deuk Deuk Tong was thus named (Tóng means "candy" in Cantonese). Today, in order to cater to young people's tastes, different flavours of Deuk Deuk Tong are also made, including coconut, chocolate, mango, banana, and strawberry flavours.

See also
Dragon's beard candy
White Rabbit Creamy Candy

External links
GTO 的偉大記事: 細味人間 People Profiles (啄硺糖)
叮叮糖 (Ding Ding Tong)
叮叮麥芽糖 聲響引小孩 (The sound of Ding Ding Tong draws the children)

Hong Kong cuisine
Chinese confectionery
Candy